Bivalent may refer to:
Bivalent (chemistry), a molecule formed from two or more atoms bound together
Bivalent (engine), an engine that can operate on two different types of fuel
Bivalent (genetics), a pair of homologous chromosomes
Bivalent logic, a classical logic of two values, true and false
Bivalent vaccine, a vaccine directed at two pathogens or two strains of a pathogen
A verb with a valency of two

See also